"Ex-Old Man" is a song recorded by American country music artist Kristen Kelly. It was released in April 2012 as Kelly's first single. Kelly wrote the song with Paul Overstreet.

Critical reception
Billy Dukes of Taste of Country gave the song two and a half stars out of five, writing that "the plucky, mid-tempo cut showcases her big country voice, but seems written too long after the fact." Matt Bjorke of Roughstock gave the song a favorable review, saying that "the melody recalls classic hits of the distant past but it also has a sunny disposition to it as well." Ben Foster of Country Universe gave the song a B+ grade, writing that "it’s a refreshing change of pace to hear a new artist taking a back-to-basics approach – revisiting a classic yet often ignored country music theme, with a simple drum and acoustic guitar-driven arrangement that actually makes the song feel like country music."

Music video
The music video was directed by Anna Mastro and premiered in August 2012.

Chart performance
"Ex-Old Man" debuted at number 60 on the U.S. Billboard Hot Country Songs chart for the week of March 24, 2012.

Year-end charts

References

Kristen Kelly songs
Arista Nashville singles
Songs written by Paul Overstreet
Song recordings produced by Tony Brown (record producer)
2012 debut singles
2012 songs